Dr. Eldon R. Smith OC, MD, FRCPC is the Chair of the Strategic Advisory Board of the Libin Cardiovascular Institute of Alberta (LCIA).  A cardiologist by training, he has also held numerous positions over his career including Dean of the Faculty of Medicine at the University of Calgary and the role of President for both the Canadian Cardiovascular Society and the Association of Canadian Medical Colleges.  Most recently Dr. Smith was appointed to the Board of Alberta Health Services.

In addition to Dr. Smiths's role with the LCIA, he is also Editor-in-Chief of the Canadian Journal of Cardiology. As of October 2006, Dr. Smith has been the Chair of the Canadian Heart Health Strategy and Action Plan, an initiative of the Government of Canada.  Dr. Smith is also the President and Director of the Peter Lougheed Medical Research Foundation, a national initiative to support excellence in health research in Canada.

Education 
 Dalhousie University Medical School 
 National Heart Institute, London, U.K.
 National Institutes of Health, Bethesda, Maryland

Selected awards and honors 
 Officer of the Order of Canada (2005) 
 James Graham Award, Royal College of Physicians and Surgeons of Canada
 Young Investigator's Award, Canadian Cardiovascular Society
 Keon Achievement Award, University of Ottawa
 125th Anniversary of Canada Commemorative Medal for Contributions to the Citizens of Canada
 Achievement Award, Canadian Cardiovascular Society
 Alumnus of the Year, Dalhousie University
 Certificate of Meritorious Service, Alberta College of Physicians and Surgeons
 Beamish Award for Leadership in Cardiovascular Science and Education, University of Manitoba
 Certificate of Recognition, Royal College of Physicians and Surgeons of Canada
 Order of the University, University of Calgary
 Citation from the Senate of the Philippines for aid in developing medical education in that country
 2005 Medal of Service, Canadian Medical Association
 2007 Outstanding Contribution to the Alberta Science and Technology Community
 2013 Grant MacEwan Lifetime Achievement Award

Corporate boards 
 Member, Board of Directors, Canadian Natural Resources Limited
 Member, Board of Directors, Aston Hill Financial Inc.
 Member, Board of Directors,  Resverlogix Ltd.
 Member, Board of Directors, Intelliphatmaceutics Int'l

References

External links
 Biography - Libin Cardiovascular Institute of Alberta
 Interview with ER Smith (part 1)
 Interview with ER Smith (part 2)
 Coverage of CHHS & AP reports to Government of Canada

Year of birth missing (living people)
Living people
Canadian cardiologists